John Tanner Neve (2 October 1902 – 7 July 1976) was an English cricketer. A right-handed batsman and right-arm medium pace bowler, he played one first-class match for the Marylebone Cricket Club in 1936.

Career

In 1926, Neve played for the Straits Settlements against the Federated Malay States in Kuala Lumpur. Nine years later, in 1935, he played for the MCC against Ireland at Lord's.

In 1936, he played his only first-class game, for the MCC against Ireland in Dublin. The following year he played for the MCC on a tour of Canada. In 1938, he played for the MCC against Ireland in Dublin, and for the Minor Counties against Sir J Cahn's XI.

References

1902 births
1976 deaths
English cricketers
Straits Settlements cricketers
Marylebone Cricket Club cricketers
People from Benenden
People educated at Cheltenham College
Sportspeople from Gloucestershire